The Palmetto State Quartet was a professional Southern Gospel quartet that originated in  Greenville, South Carolina, in the mid-1940s. In 1988 they received at a Singing News Fan Awards ceremony the Marvin Norcross Award for contributions to Southern Gospel over their career. Their song "Knock, Knock, Knock" was dubbed "number one radio single" by Singing News magazine in 2004.

Personnel History

TENOR
Leon Sutherland (1948–1949)
Clarence Owens (1949–1960)
Claude Hunter (1960–1963)
Jerry Hovis (1963–1970)
Claude Hunter (1970–1985)
Eddie Broome (1985–1993)
Brion Carter (1993–2002)
John Rulapaugh (2002–2006)
Wesley Smith (2006–2008, 2011))
Jeremy Calloway (2008–2009)
Robert Fulton (2009–2011)
Jeremy Easley (2011-2013)
LEAD
Woodrow Pittman (1948–1954)
Jack Pittman (1954-1960?) (at some point Pittman & Bagwell switched parts)
Jack Bagwell (1960–1968)
Harold Schronce (1968–70)
Jack Bagwell (1970-1997)
Kerry Beatty (1997–2009)
Paul Lancaster (2009-2013)
David Staton (2013)

BARITONE
Malone Thomason (1948–1952)
Jack Bagwell (1952-1960?) (at some point Pittman & Bagwell switched parts)
Jack Pittman (1960–1967)
Laverne Tripp (1967–68)
Jerome Bush (1968–69)
Milton Sigmon (1969–70)
Jack Pittman (1970–1997)
Tony Peace (1997–2004)
Rick Fair (2004–2008)
Brian Beatty (2008–2009)
David Darst (2009–2012)
David Staton (2012-2013)
DaRon Maughon (2013)

BASS
Paul Burroughs (1948–1955)
Ellison Jenkins (1955–1961)
Ken Turner (1961–1968)
Joe Divine (1968-1969)
Chuck Bright (1969-1970)
Cliff King (1970–1976)
Jerry Trotter (1976–1979)
Joel Duncan (1979–1994)
Harold Gilley (1994–1997)
Jeff Pearles (1997–2003)
Jason Brooks (2003)
Aaron McCune (2003–2006)
Burman Porter (2006–2008)
Larry Strickland (2008–2013)
Mike Allen (2013)

PIANO
Milton Bishop (1948–1949)
Jamie Dill (1949–1968)
Charles Abee (1968–1969)
Carroll Melvin (1970)
Jamie Dill (1970–1987)
David McAbee (1987–1989)
Hovie Lister (1989–1991)
Woody Beatty (1991–1999)
Jerry Kelso (1999–2001)
Andrew Ishee (2001–2006)
Bryan Elliott (2006–2008)
KC Martin (2008–2009)
Mark Carman (2009–2010)
Mark Willett (2010–2010)
KC Martin (2010-2013)

VARIOUS
Charles Waller (1983–1997, Manager/Promoter)
Eddie Broome (1984–1985, Bass Guitar/Vocals)
Louie Sprouse (1986, Bass Guitar)
J.J. Jennings (1987, Bass Guitar)
Woody Beatty (1990–1991, Keyboards)
Michael W. Carman (2008-2011, Road Manager)

American gospel musical groups
Gospel quartets
Musical groups established in the 1940s
Musical groups from South Carolina
Southern gospel performers